For the similarly titled 1974 Stevie Wonder song, see "Living for the City"

Living in the City is an album by the progressive bluegrass band Northern Lights. After this album two members left the band, Jake Armerding and Jeff Horton, both to pursue their own music.

Track listing

Personnel
 Taylor Armerding - mandolin, guitar, vocals
 Jeff Horton - bass, vocals
 Bill Henry - vocals, guitar
 Mike Kropp - banjo, guitar
 Jake Armerding - violin, mandolin, vocals

References

External links
 Official site

1996 albums
Northern Lights (bluegrass band) albums
Red House Records albums